A fidget spinner is a toy that consists of a ball bearing in the center of a multi-lobed (typically two or three) flat structure made from metal or plastic designed to spin along its axis with pressure. Fidget spinners became trending toys in 2017, although similar devices had been invented as early as 1993.

The toy has been promoted as helping people who have trouble focusing or those who may need to fidget to relieve nervous energy, anxiety, or psychological stress. There are claims that a fidget spinner can help calm down people who have anxiety or neurodivergences, like ADHD and autism. However, as of March 2022, there was no scientific evidence that they are effective as a treatment for ADHD.

Development 
In October 2016, inspired by the Fidget Cube Kickstarter campaign, Allan Maman used his Byram Hills High Schools 3-D printers to make Fidget360 with the help of his physics teacher, Eric Savino  and worked with Cooper Weiss to promote the toy.

In an interview appearing on 4 May 2017 on NPR, Scott McCoskery described how he invented a metal spinning device, Torqbar, in 2014 to cope with his own fidgeting in IT meetings and conference calls. In response to requests from an online community, he began selling the device online.

Popularity and usage

With the rapid increase in the popularity of fidget spinners in 2017, many children and teenagers began using them in school, and some schools also reported that students were trading and selling the spinner toys.

As a result of their frequent use by school children, many school districts banned the toy. Some teachers argued that the spinners distracted students from their schoolwork. According to a survey conducted by Alexi Roy and published in May 2017, 32% of the largest 200 American public and private high schools had banned spinners on campus.

When fidget spinners rose in popularity in 2017, many publications in the popular press discussed the marketing claims made about them for people with ADHD, autism, or anxiety. However, there is no scientific evidence that fidget spinners are effective as a treatment for children with ADHD. They quickly fell in popularity and sales after peaking in May 2017.

Patent status 
As of 2017, the patent status of the various fidget spinners on the market was unclear. Catherine Hettinger, a chemical engineer by training, was initially credited by some news stories as having been the inventor of the fidget spinner, including by media outlets such as The Guardian, The New York Times, and the New York Post. Hettinger filed a patent application for a "spinning toy" in 1993 and a patent was issued, but Hettinger allowed the patent to lapse in 2005 after she could not find a commercial partner. However, a May 2017 Bloomberg News article showed that Hettinger was not the inventor of the fidget spinner, and Hettinger agreed.

See also 

 Fidget Cube
 Office toy
 Stress ball
 Top
 Worry stone

References

External links 

2010s fads and trends
2010s toys
American inventions
Executive toys
Mechanical toys
Metal toys
Plastic toys
Products introduced in 1993
20th-century inventions
Toy controversies
Internet memes introduced in 2017
Physical activity and dexterity toys
Novelty items
Sensory toys